Mysteries of Creation is a musical compilation, released on October 22, 1996 by the Axiom record label.

Track listing

Release history

References

External links 
 
 Mysteries of Creation at Bandcamp

1996 compilation albums
Bill Laswell compilation albums
Albums produced by Bill Laswell
Axiom (record label) compilation albums